Qırxbulaq is a village and municipality in the Shaki Rayon of Azerbaijan. It has a population of 435.

Populated places in Shaki District